Norverapamil is a calcium channel blocker. It is the main active metabolite of verapamil.

References
 

Calcium channel blockers
Phenol ethers
Nitriles
Isopropyl compounds
Amines
Human drug metabolites